Luverdense Esporte Clube, commonly referred to as Luverdense, is a Brazilian professional club based in Lucas do Rio Verde, Mato Grosso founded on 24 January 2004. It competes in the Campeonato Mato-Grossense, the top flight of the Mato Grosso state football league.

History
The club was founded on January 24, 2004, by entrepreneurs and farmers. The club name, Luverdense, refers to the used to refer to people born in Lucas do Rio Verde city.

The club won the Copa Governador do Mato Grosso in 2004, in 2007 and in 2011. As the club won the 2007 edition, the club qualified to the 2008 Série C. Luverdense won the Campeonato Mato-Grossense for the first time on May 17, 2009, after beating Araguaia in the final.

The club was eliminated in the First Stage in the 2005 Série C, in the Third Stage in 2008, in the First Stage in 2009, in the First Stage in the 2010 and in the First Stage in 2011.

Honours
 Copa Verde
 Winners (1): 2017

 Campeonato Mato-Grossense
 Winners (3): 2009, 2012, 2016

 Copa FMF
 Winners (4): 2004, 2007, 2011, 2019

External links
Official website

References

Luverdense Esporte Clube
Association football clubs established in 2004
2004 establishments in Brazil
Football clubs in Mato Grosso
Copa Verde winners